After the Flood may refer to:

Literature
 After the Flood (novel), a 1982 novel by the Swedish novelist P. C. Jersild
 After the Flood, a 2012 manga novel in the Warriors series by Erin Hunter

Music
 After the Flood: Live from the Grand Forks Prom, June 28, 1997, a live album by Soul Asylum released in 2004
 After the Flood, a 2004 album by Clumsy Lovers
 "After the Flood", a song by Talk Talk from the 1991 album Laughing Stock
 "After the Flood", a song by Van der Graaf Generator from the 1970 album The Least We Can Do Is Wave to Each Other